Willi Sanke published a series of about 600-700 numbered photo-postcards, showing World War I aviators c. 1910 - 1918/20.

Overview
Willi was based in Berlin and his cards were often issued under the name of Postkartenvertrieb W. Sanke (Post Card Distribution W. Sanke). 

On some of these postcards, the photographers are identified: for example, Fritz Fischer, Nicola Perscheid (1864–1930), and Alfred Krauth.

See also
List of World War I flying aces

References

External links
USPS Postage Stamps

Postcards
Aviation in World War I